Project Unigauge, started on 1 April 1992, is an ongoing effort by Indian Railways to convert and unify all rail gauges in India to  broad gauge.

Progress 

Following table tracks the yearly changes.

Lines where conversion is yet to start

Western Railway 

  –  –   (MG)
  –   (MG)
  –  –   (MG)
  –   (MG)
  –   (NG)
  –   (NG)
  –   (NG)

North Eastern Railway 

 Nanpara – Nepalganj Road  (MG)
 Nanpara – Bahraich  (MG)
 Nanpara –  –  (MG)

North Western Railway 

 Marwar – Mavli  (MG)

North Central Railway 

Mathura Junction – Vrindavan (MG)

Lines under conversion

Western Railway 

  – Adraj Moti  (MG)
  –  – Pratapnagar Junction   (NG)
  –   (MG)
  –  –   (MG)
  –  –   (MG)
  – Jasdan  (MG)
 Timba Road – Dabhoi  (NG) 
  –   (MG)
  – Taranga Hill  (MG)
  – Khedbrahma  (MG)
 Shapur – Saradiya  (MG)
 Khalipur Junction – Kakoshi Metrana Road  (MG)
 Chanasma Junction – Harij  (MG)
  –   (NG)
  –  –   (NG)
  –   (NG)
  –   (NG)

Central Railway 

  – Yavatmal 
  –   (NG)
  –   (NG)
  – Arvi  (NG)

East Central Railway 

  –  –   (MG)
 Mahrail –   (MG)

North Central Railway 

  –   (NG)
 Dhaulpur –  – Sirmuttra  (NG)
  – Tantpur  (NG)

North Eastern Railway 

  – Jarwa  in UP (MG)
 Shahgarh – Pilibhit Junction  (MG)
 Dohrighat –   (MG)

Northeast Frontier Railway 

 Simaluguri – Naginimora  (MG)
 Chalsa – Metelli  (MG)
  –  (MG)

South Central Railway 

  –  (130.66 km) (MG)

South East Central Railway 

  –  – Kendri  (NG)
 Itwari Junction – Nagbhir Junction  (NG)
  –   (NG)

Southern Railway 

  – Tarangambadi  (MG)
  –  (MG)
  –  (MG)
  –  (NG)
  –   –  (NG)

Lines where conversion is completed 

 Jhanjharpur –   in Bihar
  –  in UP
  – Becharaji in Gujarat
  – Agasthiyampalli in Tamil Nadu
  –  –  in Gujarat/Rajasthan 
  – Forbesganj in Bihar
  –  in Bihar/Nepal
  – Bari Sadri in Rajasthan
  Sakri –  in Bihar
  –  in Madhya Pradesh
  –  in Gujarat
 Dabhoi –  in Gujarat
  –  in Gujarat
 Walaja Road Junction – Ranippettai in Tamil Nadu
  –  in Madhya Pradesh
  –  in Gujarat
  –  in Madhya Pradesh
  – Varetha in Gujarat
  – in Uttar pradesh 
  –  in UP
  –  in Madhya Pradesh
  –   in Tamil Nadu
  –  in Bihar
  –  in Gujarat
  –  in Maharastra
  – Chandod in Gujarat
  –  in Madhya Pradesh
  –  in Gujarat
  –  –  in UP
  –  in UP
 Banmankhi – Bihariganj  in Bihar
  –  in Tamil Nadu
  –  in Rajasthan
  –  in West Bengal
  –  in West Bengal
  –  in Uttar Pradesh
  –  in Bihar
  –  in Gujarat
  –  in Uttar Pradesh
  –  in Kerala
  – Sardarshahar in Rajasthan
  –  in Tamil Nadu
 Baraigram Junction –  in Assam
  –  in Rajasthan
  –  in Madhya Pradesh
  –  in Madhya Pradesh/Maharastra 
  –  in Uttar Pradesh
  –  in Assam/Tripura
  –  in Assam/Manipur
  –  in Assam/Mizoram 
  –  in Madhya Pradesh
  –  in Rajasthan
  –  in Bihar (36 km)
 Thawe –  in Bihar
 Kotturu – Gunda Road in Karnataka
  – 
  –  
  –  in Assam
 Balipara –  in Assam
  –  in Assam
  –  in Tamil Nadu/Kerala
  –  in Rajasthan
  –  in Uttar Pradesh
  – in Bihar
  –  in Tamil Nadu
  –  in Madhya Pradesh
  –  in Gujarat
  –  in Uttar Pradesh
  –  in Assam
  –  – Harmuti Junction in Assam
  –  in Tamil Nadu
 Kolar – Chikkaballapur in Karnataka
  –  in Uttar Pradesh
  –  in Tamil Nadu
  –  in West Bengal
  – Thawe in Uttar Pradesh
  –  in Bihar
  –  in Rajasthan
  –  in Karnataka
  –  in Tamil Nadu
  –  in Tamil Nadu
 Bodeli –  in Gujarat
  –  in Uttar Pradesh
  –  in West Bengal
  – 
  –  –  in Gujarat
  –  in Odisha
  –  in Uttar Pradesh
  –  in Karnataka
  –  in Karnataka
 Sakleshpur –  in Karnataka
  –  –  in Rajasthan
  –  in Rajasthan
  –  in Andhra Pradesh
  –  in Tamil Nadu
  –  –  in Rajasthan/Haryana
  – Kalluru in Andhra Pradesh
  –  in Uttar Pradesh
  –  in Maharastra
  –  in Uttar Pradesh

Lines that were scrapped 
These lines were dismantled. These were mostly industrial railways, forest railways, etc.

 
 –Pani Mines 
  – Lunavada  
  – Velavadar  
 Than – Chotila 
 Victor – Dungar Junction 
  – Toda Rai Singh 
  – Chandan Chauki 
  – Gauri Phanta 
 Nabadwip Ghat –  
  – Kodiyakkarai

Lines which are preserved (will not be converted) 

These lines have their original gauge preserved as these are identified as heritage railways. Some of these are also among the UNESCO World Heritage Sites in India.

 Darjeeling Himalayan Railway  (NG)
 Kalka–Shimla Railway  (NG) 
 Kangra Valley Railway  (NG)
 Matheran Hill Railway  (NG) 
 Nilgiri Mountain Railway  (MG)

See also 

 Future of rail transport in India
 List of gauge conversions
 Zones and divisions of Indian Railways

References 

History of rail transport in India